Moscow Stars was a Russian UCI Continental cycling team.

References

Defunct cycling teams based in Russia
Sports clubs in Moscow
Cycling teams established in 2005
Cycling teams disestablished in 2007
UCI Continental Teams (Europe)
2005 establishments in Russia
2007 disestablishments in Russia